Mohd Nizam bin Abu Bakar (born 16 September 1984) is a Malaysian footballer who plays for Malaysia Premier League club Felcra as a defender.

References

External links
 

1984 births
Living people
Malaysian footballers
Felda United F.C. players
Negeri Sembilan FA players
PKNS F.C. players
Association football defenders